The Allsvenskan play-offs was a Swedish football cup held to decide the Swedish football champions between 1982 and 1990. The cup was created to increase the average attendance for Allsvenskan since public interest had dropped remarkably in the previous years. The four best placed teams in Allsvenskan qualified for the cup. The cup was succeeded by Mästerskapsserien to decide the champions.

Winners

See also 
 Football in Sweden
 Swedish football league system

External links 
  Swedish Football Association

Defunct football competitions in Sweden
Recurring sporting events established in 1982
Allsvenskan
1982 establishments in Sweden